The Cliff Town Congregational Church is a Grade II listed church in Southend-on-Sea, Essex, England. It was designed by W. Allen Dixon in around 1865.

References

External links

Churches in Southend-on-Sea (town)
Buildings designed by W. Allen Dixon
Congregational churches in Essex
Grade II listed churches in Essex
Methodist churches in Essex